Emily Gray Rice (born October 11, 1955) is an American attorney. She served as United States Attorney for the District of New Hampshire.

Early life and education
Rice was born in Boston, Massachusetts on October 11, 1955. She received her Bachelor of Arts cum laude in 1977 from Boston University, her Master of Arts in 1979 from Boston University, and her Juris Doctor in 1984 from Northeastern University School of Law.

Legal career
From 1984 to 1993, she served in the New Hampshire Attorney General's Office in the Bureau of Civil Law, where she served as Senior Assistant Attorney General and Chief of the Bureau of Civil Law from 1989 to 1993. From 1993 to 2001, she worked at the law firm of Dean, Rice & Kane, P.A., where she was elevated to shareholder in 1995. From 2001 to 2012, she was a shareholder in the law firm of Orr & Reno, P.A.. From 2012 to 2015 she was a shareholder in the law firm of Bernstein, Shur, Sawyer & Nelson, P.A. where she practiced civil litigation in a variety of subject matters.

United States Attorney
On October 8, 2015 President Barack Obama nominated Rice to be the United States Attorney for the District of New Hampshire. On December 10, 2015 her nomination was reported out of committee by voice vote. On December 15, 2015, her nomination was confirmed by the full United States Senate by voice vote. She was sworn into office on January 11, 2016. She resigned from her post on March 10, 2017.

See also
2017 dismissal of U.S. attorneys

References

Living people
1955 births
Lawyers from Boston
Boston University alumni
Northeastern University School of Law alumni
New Hampshire lawyers
United States Attorneys for the District of New Hampshire
20th-century American lawyers
21st-century American lawyers
20th-century American women lawyers
21st-century American women lawyers